Penionomus is a genus of jumping spiders that was first described by Eugène Louis Simon in 1903.  it contains only three species, found only in Pakistan and on New Caledonia: P. dispar, P. dyali, and P. longipalpis.

References

Salticidae genera
Salticidae
Spiders of Asia
Spiders of Oceania